Volume Up is a South Korean radio show currently hosted by Heize on KBS 2FM in Seoul and UKBS MUSIC DMB in the provinces, airing every day at 20:10–22:00 (KST), just right after KBS 2FM News 8PM edition. Known as the ruler of the dinner time the show became the highest-rated radio program in its time slot across both AM and FM bandwidths in Seoul. KBS 2FM was South Korea's No. 10 station. Popular for soft music playlist, a short soap opera segment called Lie to Me based on the 2011 TV drama of the same title and Yoo's "My Final Message".

Host
 – Current host

See also 
 Kiss the Radio
 KBS 2FM

References

External links

Volume Up on Instagram

South Korean radio programs
Korean Broadcasting System
Korean-language radio programs